Indian Township is an inactive township in Pike County, in the U.S. state of Missouri.

Indian Township was erected in 1842, taking its name from Indian Creek.

References

Townships in Missouri
Townships in Pike County, Missouri